Budapest is an unincorporated community in Ripley County, in the U.S. state of Missouri.

History
A post office called Budapest was established in 1912, and remained in operation until 1922. The community most likely was named after Budapest, in Hungary, the native land of a share of the early settlers.

References

Unincorporated communities in Ripley County, Missouri
Hungarian-American history
Unincorporated communities in Missouri